Özlem Belçim Galip is a scholar and researcher who obtained a PhD in Kurdish studies from Exeter University. Her work on Kurdish literature has been described as influential.

Works
Galip, Ö. B. (2012), Kurdistan: A Land of Longing and Struggle Analysis of ‘Home-land’ and ‘Identity’ in the Kurdish Novelistic Discourse from Turkish Kurdistan to its Diaspora (1984-2010), Ph.D. diss., Exeter: Exeter University.

References

Kurdish studies
Kurdish literature
Alumni of the University of Exeter
Year of birth missing (living people)
Living people